The Original Soundtrack is the third studio album by the English rock band 10cc. It was released in 1975 and peaked at number three on the UK Albums Chart. The Original Soundtrack includes the singles "Life Is a Minestrone", and "I'm Not in Love", the band's most popular song.

The album received good reviews when originally released on LP, 8-Track and cassette by Mercury Records in March 1975. It was ranked number 976 in All-Time Top 1000 Albums (2000).

Background 
The album was recorded and produced by the band at Strawberry Studios in 1974 with Eric Stewart engineering and mixing. The album was the first to be released by Mercury Records after signing the band for $1 million in February 1975. The catalyst for the deal was the fact the record executives had heard one song – "I'm Not in Love". Eric Stewart recalled:

The rest of the album, which was already complete, was released just weeks later.

The artwork was designed by Hipgnosis and illustrated by artist Humphrey Ocean.

Release
The album has been reissued on several occasions with bonus tracks including b-sides and single edits and has been remastered.

Reception 

The Original Soundtrack was a critical and commercial success reaching No. 3 in the UK and No. 15 in the U.S.

Ken Barnes gave the album a rave review in Rolling Stone, commenting, "Musically there's more going on than in ten Yes albums, yet it's generally as accessible as a straight pop band (though less so than the two preceding 10cc LPs)." He particularly praised the album for being ambitious without being excessive or pretentious, and for its lyrical content.

Village Voice critic Robert Christgau panned the album, remarking of the song "I'm Not in Love": "stretching your only decent melody (a non-satirical love song) over six tedious minutes, is that a joke?"

The first single "Life Is a Minestrone" was another UK Top 10 for the band, peaking at No. 7. Their biggest success came with the song that sold the album, "I'm Not in Love", which gave the band their second UK No. 1 in June 1975, staying there for two weeks. The song also provided them with their first major US chart success when the song reached No. 2.

Track listing

Bonus tracks on the 1997 CD edition

Additional bonus tracks on Japanese edition

Personnel 
 10cc
 Eric Stewart – guitars (all but 2), lead vocals (1-6), backing vocals (1, 3–5, 7, 8), keyboards (2-4, 6, 8), percussion (8)
 Lol Creme – keyboards (all tracks), backing vocals (all tracks), percussion (1, 4, 7, 8), lead vocals (1, 3, 7), guitars (4, 6, 7), Gizmo (3, 5), vibraphone (1), violin (5), autoharp (6), mandolin (8)
 Graham Gouldman – bass guitar (all tracks), backing vocals (all but 8), guitars (2-4, 6-8), lead vocals (1, 3, 8), percussion (1), double bass (5), autoharp (6), mandolin (8)
 Kevin Godley – backing vocals (all tracks), percussion (1, 4–8), drums (1, 3, 4, 6, 7), lead vocals (1, 3, 5), Moog synthesizer (2), cello (5)
 Technical
 10cc – production
 Hipgnosis – cover design
 Humphrey Ocean – cover illustration

Charts

Weekly charts

Year-end charts

Certifications

References 

10cc albums
1975 albums
Albums with cover art by Hipgnosis
Mercury Records albums
Albums recorded at Strawberry Studios